JoAnn Dayton-Selman is an American politician and former Wyoming state legislator. A member of the Democratic Party, Dayton-Selman represented the 17th district in the Wyoming House of Representatives from 2015 to 2021.

Elections

2012
Dayton-Selman ran unopposed in the Democratic primary to replace Bernadine Craft, who was running for the Wyoming Senate. She faced former Republican State Representative Stephen Watt in the general election and lost 55% to 45%.

2014
Dayton-Selman ran unopposed in the Democratic primary, setting up a rematch against Watt. She defeated Watt, 58% to 42%.

2016
Dayton-Selman ran unopposed in both the Democratic primary and general election.

2018
Dayton-Selman ran unopposed in the Democratic primary. She defeated Republican nominee Traci Ciepiela, who had withdrawn from the race on October 31.

References

External links
Official page at the Wyoming Legislature
Profile from Ballotpedia

Living people
Democratic Party members of the Wyoming House of Representatives
Politicians from Everett, Washington
People from Rock Springs, Wyoming
21st-century American politicians
Year of birth missing (living people)